St. Sebastian Cathedral also known as Leopoldina Cathedral is a parish of the Roman Catholic Church in Leopoldina, Minas Gerais, Brazil, and seat of the Diocese of Leopoldina. It is dedicated to Saint Sebastian.

The cathedral church is located in the Dom Helvecio square of the cathedral district, which houses the parish and three dependent chapels: the Chapel of Our Lady of the Immaculate Conception, Chapel of Our Lady of Mount Carmel, and Chapel of St. Peter.

The parish of St. Sebastian was created 27 April 1854, when the elevation of the district of St. Sebastian created the city of Leopoldina. When it was created, the parish was subordinated to the then-Diocese of Rio de Janeiro. On July 16, 1897, by decision of Pope Leo XIII, it was transferred to the Diocese of Mariana.

On March 28, 1942, with the erection of the Diocese of Leopoldina, the church was elevated to cathedral status, but its construction was completed only around 1965.

See also
Catholic Church in Brazil

References

Roman Catholic cathedrals in Minas Gerais
Roman Catholic churches completed in 1965
Religious organizations established in 1854
1854 establishments in Brazil
19th-century Roman Catholic church buildings in Brazil
Saint Sebastian